Tim Göhlert (born September 15, 1984) is a German professional footballer who plays as a centre back for TSG Söflingen.

External links

Tim Göhlert at Fupa

1984 births
Living people
Association football central defenders
German footballers
SSV Ulm 1846 players
1. FC Heidenheim players
3. Liga players
VfB Fortuna Chemnitz players